The Rising Sun Auto Camp, also known as the Roes Creek Auto Camp, East Glacier Auto Camp or simply Rising Sun preserves a portion of the built-up area of Glacier National Park that documents the second phase of tourist development in the park. Rising Sun is a wayside area that has a National Park Service campground, a camp store and gift shop, picnic area, restaurant, as well as a motel and guest cabins which are managed by the park's concessionaire, Xanterra Parks & Resorts. In the immediate area, there is also a boat dock as well as sightseeing boats which allow visitors to tour Saint Mary Lake, the second largest lake in the park. "The most popular spot for [Glacier] tourists is Rising Sun, an overlook of Goose Island in St. Mary Lake and one of the most photographed spots in the park."

Establishment
After the creation of a series of hotels for train-borne visitors, courtesy of the Great Northern Railway's hotel concession, facilities were developed for the increasing numbers of automobile-borne tourists, drawn to Glacier by the Going-to-the-Sun Road. The Rising Sun Auto Camp was created for these new tourists. Located in the Rising Sun region of the park, it includes a rustic general store, built in 1941 by the Glacier Park Hotel Company, surrounded by a number of log tourist cabins., as well as a shower and laundry house and other supporting structures. 

The Rising Sun Motor Inn and Cabins preserves historic paintings donated by Glacier Park, Inc. The pieces were originally owned and/or commissioned by the Great Northern Railway, and many depict iconic scenes from in and around Glacier National Park. All are estimated to have originated between 1909 and 1915 and created by John Fery, Frank Stick, R.H. Palenske and Charles Defeo.

Nearby features
The Sun Camp Fireguard Cabin also known as the Baring Cabin was destroyed by the Reynolds Creek Wildland Fire in July 2015.

The Sun Camp Fireguard Cabin and the Rising Sun Auto Camp are listed on the National Register of Historic Places.

See also
Swiftcurrent Auto Camp Historic District
Roes Creek Campground Camptender's Cabin

References

External links

 
 

Rustic architecture in Montana
Hotel buildings on the National Register of Historic Places in Montana
Historic districts on the National Register of Historic Places in Montana
National Register of Historic Places in Glacier County, Montana
National Register of Historic Places in Glacier National Park
Going-to-the-Sun Road
Hotel buildings completed in 1941
1941 establishments in Montana
Great Northern Railway (U.S.) hotels